The 2005 ECM Prague Open was a professional tennis tournament played on clay courts at the I. Czech Lawn Tennis Club in Prague, Czech Republic from in mid-May, 2005. It was the 14th edition of the men's tournament which was part of the 2005 ATP Challenger Series and the 4th edition of the women's tournament which was part of the 2005 WTA Tour as a Tier IV tournament.

Points and prize money

Note: this information was only available for the women's tournament

Point distribution

Prize money

* per team

Finals

Men's singles

 Jan Hernych defeated  Jiří Vaněk, 3–6, 6–4, 6–3
 It was Hernych's 1st singles title of the year, the 2nd consecutive at Prague and his 5th title at the ATP Challenger Series.

Women's singles

 Dinara Safina defeated  Zuzana Ondrášková, 7–6(7–2), 6–3
 It was Safina's 2nd singles title of the year and the 4th of her career.

Men's doubles

 Jordan Kerr /  Sebastián Prieto defeated  Travis Parrott /  Rogier Wassen 6–4, 6–3

Women's doubles

 Émilie Loit /  Nicole Pratt defeated  Jelena Kostanić /  Barbora Strýcová, 6–7(6–8), 6–4, 6–4

References

External links
Official archived website

Prague Open
Prague Open
Prague Open
May 2005 sports events in Europe
Prague